Venga a prendere il caffè da noi, internationally released as Come Have Coffee with Us, is a 1970 Italian comedy film directed by Alberto Lattuada. It is based on the novel La spartizione by Piero Chiara. The film was awarded with two Nastro d'Argento awards, for best screenplay and for best supporting actress (Francesca Romana Coluzzi).

Cast 
Ugo Tognazzi: Emerenziano Paronzini
Francesca Romana Coluzzi: Tarsilla Tettamanzi
Milena Vukotic: Camilla Tettamanzi
Angela Goodwin: Fortunata Tettamanzi
Jean Jacques Fourgeaud: Paolino
Valentine: Caterina, the maid
Checco Rissone: Mansueto Tettamanzi 
Piero Chiara: Pozzi 
Alberto Lattuada: Raggi, the doctor

See also        
 List of Italian films of 1970

References

External links

1970 films
Commedia all'italiana
Films directed by Alberto Lattuada
Italian comedy films
1970 comedy films
Films scored by Fred Bongusto
1970s Italian-language films
1970s Italian films